MV Normandie is a ferry operated by Brittany Ferries. She was built at Kværner Masa-Yards Turku New Shipyard in Finland and has been sailing for Brittany Ferries since 1992.

SECA 2015 refit
On the 1st January 2015, the EU (including the North Sea, English Channel, Eastern side of the Western Channel and Baltic Sea) will have sulphur in marine fuel cut from the allowance in 2014 of 1% to 0.1% of sulphur allowed. Later that month, Brittany Ferries then announced three intentions; To fit scrubbers to a number of older vessels, to convert newer vessels to LNG, and to construct a new LNG powered ferry. Later, Brittany Ferries withdrew and cancelled the order for a new LNG-powered ferry and for the LNG conversions, and instead announced that all vessels were to have scrubbers systems fitted. Accordingly, Normandie was fitted with a scrubber in October 2015. In the same dry dock visit, improvements were made to her public areas.

Routes served

Portsmouth-Caen (Ouistreham) 1992–present

Normandie rarely strays from the route for which she was built, however she has operated between Portsmouth and Cherbourg on a number of sailings, mostly for Christmas and New Year layovers but also in 1994 to transport the Tour de France back to its home country after a leg in the United Kingdom.

In late 2016, Brittany Ferries signed a letter of intent with Flensburger Schiffbau-Gesellschaft for a new cruise ferry between Portsmouth-Caen to be delivered in 2019. The new vessel, Honfleur, would result in a fleet movement with Normandie assigned to the Portsmouth-Le Havre service from late 2019.

In June 2020 Brittany Ferries announced the cancellation of the Honfleur contract with the Flensburger Schiffbau-Gesellschaft shipyard in Germany meaning Normandie will remain in the Portsmouth-Caen route.

External links
 Official Brittany Ferries Website
 about MV Normandie Official Brittany Ferries Website

Ferries of the United Kingdom
Ferries of France
Cruiseferries
Ships built in Turku
1991 ships